Dehnow-e Shahsavar Khan (also Romanized as Dehnow-e Shahsavār Khān; also known as Deh-i-Nau, Dehnow, and Dehnow-e Shahsavārī) is a village in Hoseynabad Rural District, Esmaili District, Anbarabad County, Kerman Province, Iran. At the 2006 census, its population was 1,555, in 287 families.

References 

Populated places in Anbarabad County